Maardis is a Syrian village located in the Suran Subdistrict in Hama District. According to the Syria Central Bureau of Statistics (CBS), Maardis had a population of 6,750 in the 2004 census. Its inhabitants are predominantly Sunni Muslims.

References

Bibliography

 

Populated places in Salamiyah District